Qaduneh may refer to:
 Qaduneh-ye Olya
 Qaduneh-ye Sofla